Greenea is a genus of flowering plants in the family Rubiaceae. The genus is found from Indo-China to Sumatra. It is named in honor of Benjamin D. Greene.

Species 

Greenea adangensis Tange
Greenea commersonii (Korth.) Tange ex Ruhsam
Greenea corymbosa (Jack) Voigt
Greenea montana Tange
Greenea parkinsonii C.E.C.Fisch.
Greenea rivularis Tange
Greenea schizocorolla Tange
Greenea secunda (Griff.) Craib
Greenea vietnamensis Tange

References

External links 
 Greenea in the World Checklist of Rubiaceae

Rubiaceae genera
Greeneeae